Primera División A (Méxican First A Division) is a Mexican football tournament. This season was composed of Apertura 2005 and Clausura 2006. Querétaro was the winner of the promotion to First Division after winning Puebla in the promotion playoff.

Changes for the 2005–06 season
Chivas La Piedad relocated to Tepic and renamed to Chivas Coras.
Celaya relocated to Salamanca and renamed Petroleros de Salamanca.
Mérida F.C. was acquired by new owners, for that reason the team was moved to Irapuato and renamed Club Irapuato.
Pachuca Juniors relocated to Ciudad Juárez and renamed Indios.
Pioneros de Obregón relocated to Tijuana and renamed Dorados de Tijuana.
Potros Neza was relocated to Tampico and renamed Tampico Madero.
Académicos de Atlas was promoted from Second Division, the club was renamed Coyotes de Sonora and re-located to Hermosillo, Sonora.
Huracanes de Colima was bought by Televisa, the team relocated to Playa del Carmen and renamed to Águilas Riviera Maya. At the end of the Apertura tournament, the team was relocated to Zacatepec as a result of Hurricane Wilma impact. From the Clausura tournament, the team was renamed as Club Zacatepec.
Rayados A and Tigres Mochis new teams.

Stadiums and locations

Clausura 2006 new team

Apertura 2005

Group league tables

Group 1

Group 2

Group 3

Group 4

General league table

Results

Reclasification series

First leg

Second leg

Liguilla 

(p.t.) The team was classified by its position in the general table

Quarter-finals

First leg

Second leg

Semi-finals

First leg

Second leg

Final

First leg

Second leg

Clausura 2006

Group league tables

Group 1

Group 2

Group 3

Group 4

General league table

Results

Reclasification series

First leg

Second leg

Liguilla 

(p.t.) The team was classified by its position in the general table

Quarter-finals

First leg

Second leg

Semi-finals

First leg

Second leg

Final

First leg

Second leg

Relegation table

Promotion final
The Promotion Final faced Puebla against Querétaro to determine the winner of the First Division Promotion. Querétaro was the winner.

First leg

Second leg

References

2005–06 in Mexican football
Mexico
Mexico
Ascenso MX seasons